Taylor Jenkins Reid is an American author most known for her novels The Seven Husbands of Evelyn Hugo, Daisy Jones & The Six, One True Loves and Malibu Rising.

Career
Reid graduated from Emerson College in Boston and majored in media studies. She began her career in film production.

After graduating from college, she moved to Los Angeles and worked as a casting assistant. Reid also worked at a high school before she got a book deal. She signed with her first literary agent at age 24.

Forever, Interrupted, her first novel, was published in 2013. Reid co-wrote the television show Resident Advisors, which premiered in 2015.

Her book One True Loves was published in 2016. The film adaption will be released in 2023 starring Phillipa Soo, Simu Liu and Luke Bracey. 

Her novel The Seven Husbands of Evelyn Hugo was published in 2017 to commercial and critical acclaim. The novel tells the story of a fictional Old Hollywood star as she reveals the long-held secrets tarnishing both her mysterious life and glamorous marriages.

Reid's 2019 novel Daisy Jones & The Six recounts the ups and downs of a fictional 1970s rock band and loosely is based on Fleetwood Mac. Daisy Jones & The Six won the Goldsboro Books Glass Bell Award in 2020. The novel was a finalist for Book of the Month's Book of the Year award in 2021. The audiobook version was named of Apple’s Books’ Best Audiobooks of 2019. Amazon Studios developed Daisy Jones & The Six into a web-based miniseries, also titled Daisy Jones & The Six, which debuted in 2023.

Reid published Carrie Soto Is Back in 2022. It is the fourth and presumed final book of Reid's "famous women quartet," following The Seven Husbands of Evelyn Hugo, Daisy Jones & The Six, and Malibu Rising. Reid stated that she intends to take an extended break before beginning her next literary project.

Personal life
Reid was born in Maryland on December 21, 1983. At age 12, Reid and her family moved to Acton, Massachusetts. While working in the film industry, she met and married Alex Jenkins Reid, a screenwriter. They live in Los Angeles with their daughter.

Bibliography

Novels 
 Forever, Interrupted (2013)
 After I Do (2014)
 Maybe in Another Life (2015)
 One True Loves (2016)
 The Seven Husbands of Evelyn Hugo (2017)
 Daisy Jones & The Six (2019)
 Malibu Rising (2021)
 Carrie Soto Is Back (2022)

Short stories 
 Evidence of the Affair (2018)

Awards 
 2019 Winner Goodreads Choice Awards – Best Historical Fiction for Daisy Jones & The Six 
 2021 Winner Goodreads Choice Awards – Best Historical Fiction for Malibu Rising 
 2022 Winner Goodreads Choice Awards – Best Historical Fiction for Carrie Soto is Back

References

External links
Official website

Living people
21st-century American novelists
American women novelists
21st-century American women writers
Novelists from Massachusetts
American television writers
American women television writers
Screenwriters from Massachusetts
21st-century American screenwriters
1983 births